Moorhead Municipal Airport  is a city-owned public-use airport located four miles south east of the central business district of Moorhead, a city in Clay County, Minnesota.

Facilities and aircraft 
Moorhead Municipal Airport covers an area of 180 acres which contains one runway designated 12/30 with a 4,300 x 75 ft (1,311 x 23 m) asphalt surface. For the 12-month period ending September 23, 2010, the airport had 9,000 aircraft operations, an average of 25 per day: 100% general aviation. At that time there were 32 aircraft based at this airport: 39 single-engine and 3 multi-engine.

References

External links 
 

Airports in Minnesota
Buildings and structures in Clay County, Minnesota
Transportation in Clay County, Minnesota
Moorhead, Minnesota
Transportation in Minnesota